Booker Little Jr. (April 2, 1938 – October 5, 1961) was an American jazz trumpeter and composer. He appeared on many recordings in his short career, both as a sideman and as a leader. Little performed with Max Roach, John Coltrane, and Eric Dolphy and was strongly influenced by Sonny Rollins and Clifford Brown. He died aged 23.

Early life 
Booker Little Jr. was born in Memphis, Tennessee to Booker, a Pullman porter who was a trombonist, and his wife Ophelia Little, who was a church organist. He also was the brother of Helena, Vivian, and Vera Little (Vera later sung with the London Opera Company). From a musically inclined family, Little naturally gravitated towards music. Like his father, he attempted to learn the trombone but instead choose clarinet at the age of 12. At 14, he finally settled on trumpet as his band director urged him play that instrument. In 1952, Little attended Manassas High School where he would begin his development on trumpet and later graduate. Being in Memphis, Little was able to develop his talent with contemporaries such as Phineas Newborn Jr., George Coleman, Frank Strozier, and his cousin Louis Smith. He was performing with Newborn on a casual basis by his mid-teens.

After graduating, he moved to Chicago, Illinois to continue his studies at the Chicago Conservatory in 1954. At the conservatory, he continued to study trumpet but also incorporated studies in composition, theory, and orchestration with a minor in piano. He would later on graduate with a bachelors degree in his main instrument. As a sophomore, Little met Sonny Rollins. For about nine months, they both stayed at the YMCA where Rollins would influence Little greatly by encouraging him to find his own sound versus mimicking other musicians.

Career

1958-1959: First Recordings With Max Roach + 4 
While attending a recording session with Rollins, Little met drummer Max Roach in 1955. Following the death of Clifford Brown the next year, Little became Roach's trumpet player in his band Max Roach Four. Being in school caused a decline and he was replaced by Kenny Dorham. Following graduation, he joined Roach's band again taking his spot back from Dorham in 1958 with Roach's group. When Little rejoined the band, he reunited with one of his friends from Memphis, George Coleman. As trumpeter, Little made his recording debut on Max Roach + 4 on the Chicago Scene in June where Little was featured on pieces like "My Old Flame". Little recorded two more albums with the group, which Roach altered by replacing the piano with tuba player Ray Draper. On Max Roach + 4 at Newport, Little introduced his first composition Minor Mode and in "A Night in Tunisia" was the main soloist, and their album, Deeds, Not Words. In the opening piece "You Stepped Out of a Dream" on Deeds, Not Words, Little displayed his writing and composition skills as he would have the tenor sax, trumpet, and tuba share similar melodies and tunes that would create tension but possess musicality due to the still piano-less group. Little had a hand in majority of the Deeds, Not Words album.

In October, the group appeared on ABC's Stars of Jazz television program. Also during October, Little recorded his first album as a leader, Booker Little 4 and Max Roach (also known as The Defiant Ones) with Roach on drums, Coleman on tenor, and Davis on bass (with Tommy Flanagan on piano). On The Defiant Ones, Little played three of his original pieces, "Rounders Mode, Dungeons Waltz", and "Jewels Tempo". Following his first album as leader, Little and Max Roach + 4 recorded one more album before the end of 1958 titled Award-Winning Drummer under Roach's name and another titled Many Sides of Max Roach in 1959 (the second album was not released until 1964). Many Sides of Max Roach was the last album Booker Little recorded with Roach's group until 1960.

1959-1960: freelancing
During his leave, Little freelanced around New York developing new acquaintances with musicians such as John Coltrane, Slide Hampton, and Teddy Charles. He was present on two of the four tracks of a reunion album with his old friends Coleman, Strozier, Smith, Phineas Newborn Jr., Calvin Newborn, George Joyner, and Charles Crosby titled Down Home Reunion, credited as by Young Men From Memphis, where the group displayed their interests in blues music. Through the course of the end of 1959 and early 1960, Little featured and worked on albums such as Slide!, Bill Henderson Sings, and the last album he recorded before returning to Roach's group, Fantastic Frank Strozier. In addition, he also recorded his second album as a lead simply titled Booker Little for Bob Shad's Time label where he introduced his original compositions such as '"Opening Statement", "Minor Sweet", "Bee Tee's minor Plea", "Life's a Little Blue" and "The Grand Valse".

1960-1961: Eric Dolphy and final recordings 

In 1960, Little rejoined Roach's band and recorded 14 albums from April 1960 to September 1961. Following his return, Little took on a bigger role being music director and composing more music for the group. The first album Roach recorded with Little as trumpeter was We Insist! - Freedom Now Suite. Little continued to work with Roach but soon met Eric Dolphy. The combination of Little and Dolphy presented the possibility of the dawning of a new sound of music. At the beginning of their newfound association, Dolphy recorded Far Cry with Little on trumpet. In addition, Little also recorded his third album as lead Out Front. This album Out Front was a result of his work on We Insist! Following the recording of We Insist, Little was hired by Nat Hentoff to write for Candid Records.

With Dolphy, he co-led a residency at the Five Spot club in New York in June 1961, from which three albums were eventually issued by the Prestige label titled Eric Dolphy at the Five Spot Volumes 1&2 and the Memorial Album. It was during this period that he began to show promise of expanding the expressive range of the "vernacular" bebop idiom which originated with Clifford Brown, his most immediate influence as a performer. Booker Little recorded his final album with Roach in August 1961 titled Percussion Bitter Sweet with Dolphy on sax and recorded his last and final album as leader entitled Booker Little and Friend (also known as Victory and Sorrow).

After years of physical pain, Little died of complications resulting from uremia on October 5, 1961, in New York City at the age 23. He was survived by his wife, two sons Booker T. III and Larry Cornelius, and two daughters Cornelia and Ana Dorsey.

Discography

As leader
1958:  Booker Little 4 and Max Roach (United Artists)
1960:  Booker Little (Time)
1960:  The Soul Of Jazz Percussion Also Released as The Third World (Warwick W-5003)
1961:  Out Front (Candid) with Julian Priester, Eric Dolphy, Don Friedman, Ron Carter, Art Davis, Max Roach
1961: Booker Little and Friend (Bethlehem) This album was re-issued as Victory and SorrowAs sideman
With Teddy Charles
 Jazz in the Garden at the Museum of Modern Art (Warwick, 1960)

With John Coltrane
 Africa/Brass (Impulse!, 1961)

With Eric Dolphy
 Far Cry (Prestige/OJC, 1960)At the Five Spot (New Jazz/OJC, 1961)

With Slide HamptonSlide Hampton and His Horn of Plenty (Strand, 1959)

With Bill HendersonBill Henderson Sings (Vee-Jay, 1959)

With Abbey Lincoln
 Straight Ahead (Candid, 1961)

With Max Roach
 Max Roach + 4 on the Chicago Scene (EmArcy, 1958)Max Roach + 4 at Newport (EmArcy, 1958)
 Deeds, Not Words (Riverside, 1958)
 Award-Winning Drummer (Time, 1958)
 The Many Sides of Max (Mercury, 1959)
 We Insist! (Candid, 1960)
 Percussion Bitter Sweet (Impulse!, 1961)
 Alone Together: The Best of the Mercury Years (Verve); Booker Little performs on three tracks recorded in 1958 and 1959

With Frank StrozierFantastic Frank Strozier'' (Vee-Jay, 1960)

References

1938 births
1961 deaths
American jazz composers
American male jazz composers
American jazz trumpeters
American male trumpeters
African-American jazz musicians
Hard bop trumpeters
Candid Records artists
Avant-garde jazz trumpeters
20th-century American composers
20th-century trumpeters
20th-century American male musicians
20th-century jazz composers
20th-century African-American musicians